Paphiopedilum argus is a species of orchid endemic to Luzon Island of the Philippines. The name is a reference to the Greek god Argus, who had one hundred eyes, like the spots on the petals. The flower size goes up to 4" (10 cm). It is commonly found on limestone in altitudes 600 to 2000 feet high.

argus
Orchids of the Philippines